The Sundaland heath forest, also known as Kerangas forest, is a type of tropical moist forest found on the island of Borneo, which is divided between Brunei, Indonesia, and Malaysia, as well as on the Indonesian islands of Belitung and Bangka, which lie to the west of Borneo.

Setting
The word Kerangas, which means "land which cannot grow rice", comes from the Iban language. Heath forests occur on acidic sandy soils that are the result of the area's siliceous parent rocks. Permanently waterlogged heath forests are known as kerapah forests. The sandy soil of the heath forest are often lacking in nutrients; it is generally considered that nitrogen is the nutrient which is most lacking for plant growth in these forests. This is in contrast to many other lowland rain forests where phosphorus is considered to be lacking.

A more recent hypothesis, proposed by Proctor (1999), is that these forests are growing on soils which are highly acidic, such that hydrogen ion toxicity prevents the growth of non-adapted species. Moreover, heath forests' low soil pH hampers organic matter decomposition thus further slowing nutrient cycling.

Flora
The Sundaland heath forests are distinct from the surrounding Borneo lowland rain forests in species composition, structure, texture, and color. The heath forests have a low, uniform canopy, with thick underbrush and rich growth of moss and epiphytes.

Many tree and plant species in the nutrient-deprived heath forests have developed unconventional ways to get their nutrients. Some tree species  (Gymnostoma nobile, for example) utilise rhizobia (nitrogen fixing bacteria) in their root nodules. Myrmecophytes, including Myrmecodia spp. and Hydnophytum spp., are tree species that develop symbiotic associations with ants to get their nutrients. Other plants, including pitcher plants (Nepenthes spp.), sundews (Drosera ssp.), and bladderwort (Utricularia ssp.), are carnivorous, trapping and digesting insects.

The heath forests are characterized by many plants of Australasian origin, including trees of families Myrtaceae and Casuarinaceae and the southern hemisphere conifers Agathis, Podocarpus, and Dacrydium.

References

Proctor, J. (1999) "Heath forests and acid soils". Botanical Journal of Scotland 51, 1-14.
Wikramanayake, Eric; Eric Dinerstein; Colby J. Loucks; et al. (2002). Terrestrial Ecoregions of the Indo-Pacific: a Conservation Assessment. Island Press; Washington, DC.

External links
 

 
Borneo
Ecoregions of Asia
Ecoregions of Indonesia
Ecoregions of Malaysia
Ecoregions of Malesia

Indomalayan ecoregions
Tropical and subtropical moist broadleaf forests